|}

The Princess of Wales's Stakes is a Group 2 flat horse race in Great Britain open to horses aged three years or older. It is run on the July Course at Newmarket over a distance of 1 mile and 4 furlongs (2,414 metres), and it is scheduled to take place each year in July.

History
The event is named in honour of Alexandra of Denmark, who became the Princess of Wales in 1863. It was established in 1894, and the inaugural running was won by Isinglass. In its early history, the race was one of the British season's most valuable and prestigious all-aged races. It was initially contested over a mile, and it was extended to its current distance in 1902.

The present system of race grading was introduced in 1971, and for a period the Princess of Wales's Stakes was classed at Group 3 level. It was promoted to Group 2 status in 1978. It is now held on the opening day of Newmarket's three-day July Festival meeting.

Records
Most successful horse (2 wins):
 Lance Chest – 1912, 1913
 Primera – 1959, 1960
 Lomond – 1965, 1966
 Millenary – 2002, 2003
 Big Orange – 2015, 2016

Leading jockey (8 wins):
 Lester Piggott – Zucchero (1952), Primera (1959, 1960), Apostle (1961), Lord Helpus (1977), Pollerton (1978), Light Cavalry (1981), Head for Heights (1984)

Leading trainer (9 wins):
 Sir Michael Stoute – Shardari (1986), Rock Hopper (1991), Saddlers' Hall (1992), Little Rock (2000), Gamut (2005), Papal Bull (2007), Doctor Fremantle (2009), Crystal Capella (2011), Fiorente (2012)

Winners since 1979

Earlier winners

 1894: Isinglass
 1895: Le Var
 1896: St Frusquin
 1897: Velasquez
 1898: Goletta
 1899: Flying Fox
 1900: Merry Gal
 1901: Epsom Lad
 1902: Veles
 1903: Ard Patrick
 1904: Rock Sand
 1905: St Denis
 1906: Dinneford
 1907: Polymelus
 1908: Queen's Advocate
 1909: Dark Ronald
 1910: Ulster King
 1911: Swynford
 1912: Lance Chest
 1913: Lance Chest
 1914: The Curragh
 1915: Rossendale
 1916: Nassovian
 1917: no race
 1918: Blink
 1919: Buchan
 1920: Attilius
 1921: Orpheus
 1922: Blandford
 1923: Triumph
 1924: Salmon-Trout
 1925: Solario
 1926: Tournesol
 1927: Colorado
 1928: Tourist
 1929: Fairway
 1930: Press Gang
 1931: Shell Transport / The Recorder *
 1932: Jacopo
 1933: Raymond
 1934: Bright Bird
 1935: Fairbairn
 1936: Taj Akbar
 1937: Flares
 1938: Pound Foolish
 1939: Heliopolis
 1940–44: no race
 1945: Stirling Castle
 1946: Airborne
 1947: Nirgal
 1948: Alycidon
 1949: Dogger Bank
 1950: Double Eclipse
 1951: Pardal
 1952: Zucchero
 1953: Rawson
 1954: Woodcut
 1955: Cobetto
 1956: Cash and Courage
 1957: Wake Up!
 1958: Miner's Lamp
 1959: Primera
 1960: Primera
 1961: Apostle
 1962: Silver Cloud
 1963: Trafalgar
 1964: Carrack
 1965: Lomond
 1966: Lomond
 1967: Hopeful Venture
 1968: Mount Athos
 1969: Harmony Hall
 1970: Prince Consort
 1971: Lupe
 1972: Falkland
 1973: Our Mirage
 1974: Buoy
 1975: Libra's Rib
 1976: Smuggler
 1977: Lord Helpus
 1978: Pollerton

* The 1931 race was a dead-heat and has joint winners.

See also
 Horse racing in Great Britain
 List of British flat horse races

References

 Paris-Turf:
 Racing Post:

 galopp-sieger.de – Princess of Wales's Stakes.
 ifhaonline.org – International Federation of Horseracing Authorities – Princess of Wales's Stakes (2019).
 pedigreequery.com – Princess of Wales's Stakes – Newmarket.
 

Flat races in Great Britain
Newmarket Racecourse
Open middle distance horse races
Recurring sporting events established in 1894